Fran Davis is a Cypriot international lawn bowler.

Bowls career
Davis was selected as part of the two woman team by Cyprus for the 2016 World Outdoor Bowls Championship, which was held in Avonhead, Christchurch, New Zealand.

She won a pairs silver medal with Linda Ryan, at the 2015 Atlantic Bowls Championships held in her home country and she has won nine titles at the Cypriot National Championships.

References

Living people
Cypriot bowls players
Year of birth missing (living people)